Gaylesville is a town in Cherokee County, Alabama, United States. The population was 144 at the 2010 census.

History
Gaylesville is named for George W. Gayle, an Alabama politician. However, Gayle may also be the name of a local Cherokee Indian. A post office has been in operation in Gaylesville since 1836.

Geography 
Gaylesville is located in northeast Cherokee County at 34°16'4.778" North, 85°33'29.678" West (34.267994, -85.558244), on the north side of the Chattooga River where it enters Weiss Lake.

Demographics 

As of the census of 2000, there were 140 people, 61 households, and 45 families residing in the town. The racial makeup of the town was 99.29% White, 0.00% Black or African American, 0.00% Native American, 0.00% Asian, 0.00% Pacific Islander, 0.00% from other races, and 0.71% from two or more races.  0.00% of the population were Hispanic or Latino of any race.

There were 61 households, out of which 21.3% had children under the age of 18 living with them, 59.0% were married couples living together, 11.5% had a female householder with no husband present, and 26.2% were non-families. 24.6% of all households were made up of individuals, and 13.1% had someone living alone who was 65 years of age or older.  The average household size was 2.30 and the average family size was 2.71.

In the town, the population was spread out, with 16.4% under the age of 18, 6.4% from 18 to 24, 33.6% from 25 to 44, 31.4% from 45 to 64, and 12.1% who were 65 years of age or older.  The median age was 43 years.  For every 100 females, there were 97.2 males.  For every 100 females age 18 and over, there were 98.3 males.

The median income for a household in the town was $26,875, and the median income for a family was $33,750. Males had a median income of $32,813 versus $20,313 for females. The per capita income for the town was $13,531. 13.0% of the population and 12.2% of families were below the poverty line. Out of the total people living in poverty, 10.7% were under the age of 18 and 10.5% were 65 or older.

Education 
Gaylesville is served by Gaylesville School (PK-12), home of the Trojans, which is a member of the Cherokee County School System.

Gaylesville Public Schools are part of the Cherokee County School District. Schools in the district include Cedar Bluff School, Centre Elementary School, Gaylesville School, Sand Rock School, Centre Middle School, Cherokee County High School, Spring Garden High School and Cherokee County Career & Technology Center.

Mitchell Guice is the Superintendent of Schools.

Notable people
 Donald L. Cunningham, Arizona Supreme Court justice
 James S. Davenport, former U.S. Representative from Oklahoma and a member of the Oklahoma Court of Criminal Appeals

References

External links 

 Gaylesville School

Towns in Alabama
Towns in Cherokee County, Alabama